Porthgwarra (meaning very wooded cove) is a small coastal village in the civil parish of St Levan, Cornwall, England, United Kingdom situated between Land's End and Porthcurno. Access to the cove is via a minor road off the B3283 road at Polgigga and leads to the car park in the village. Public conveniences include a pay telephone, a small shop and café. The South West Coast Path passes through Porthgwarra, approximately 90 minutes walk from Land's End and 45 minutes from Porthcurno.

The cove and slipway are privately owned, but the public are permitted to quietly and respectfully enjoy them. Swimming in the cove is quite safe, provided swimmers do not go beyond the headland where there are dangerous, strong sea currents. At the foot of the cove's slipway is a tunnel dug by tin miners from St Just to give farmers horse-and-cart access to the beach to collect seaweed to use as a fertiliser. A second tunnel, leading seawards, is the fishermen's access to the tidal 'hulleys' built in the rocks to store shellfish. The 'hulleys', which ceased being used about 20 years ago, had wooden floors and topcovers with trapdoors and were used to store shellfish prior to taking the catch to market once or twice a week.  The rope laid down the beach is used to steady boats while landing.

References

 Some of the information above is from the "Porthgwarra Cove Points of Interest" notice (John Chappell 2006) posted on display in the window of Porthgwarra's shop.

External links

 St Levan genealogical site

Beaches of Penwith
Villages in Cornwall
Fishing communities in England